"I'll Wait for You" is a song written by Peter De Angelis and Bob Marcucci and performed by Frankie Avalon. The song was arranged by Peter De Angelis.

Chart performance
The song reached #15 on the Billboard Top 100 in 1958.  The single's A-side, "What Little Girl", reached #79 on the Billboard Hot 100.
The song was ranked #99 on Billboard magazine's Top Hot 100 songs of 1958.

References

1958 songs
1958 singles
Songs written by Bob Marcucci
Frankie Avalon songs
Chancellor Records singles
Songs written by Peter De Angelis